Spontaneous recovery is a phenomenon of learning and memory that was first named and described by Ivan Pavlov in his studies of classical (Pavlovian) conditioning. In that context, it refers to the re-emergence of a previously extinguished conditioned response after a delay. Such a recovery of "lost" behaviors can be observed within a variety of domains, and the recovery of lost human memories is often of particular interest. For a mathematical model for spontaneous recovery see Further Reading.

In classical conditioning

Spontaneous recovery is associated with the learning process called classical conditioning, in which an organism learns to associate a neutral stimulus with a stimulus which produces an unconditioned response, such that the previously neutral stimulus comes to produce its own response, which is usually similar to that produced by the unconditioned stimulus. Although aspects of classical conditioning had been noted by previous scholars, the first experimental analysis of the process was done by Ivan Pavlov, a nineteenth-century physiologist who came across the associative effects of conditioning while conducting research on canine digestion.

To study digestion, Pavlov presented various types of food to dogs and measured their salivary response. Pavlov noticed that with repeated testing, the dogs began to salivate before the food was presented, for example when they heard the footsteps of an approaching experimenter. Pavlov named this anticipatory behavior the "conditioned" response or, more exactly, the "conditional" response. He and his associates discovered and published the basic facts about this process, which has come to be called classical or Pavlovian conditioning.

Among the phenomena that Pavlov observed was the partial recovery of a classically conditioned response after it had been extinguished by withholding the unconditioned stimulus. This recovery happened in the absence of any further unconditioned stimulation. Pavlov referred to this phenomenon as spontaneous recovery. Although the chance of spontaneous recovery increases with time following the extinction procedure, such conditioned responses do not generally return to full strength. Moreover, with repeated recovery/extinction cycles, the conditioned response tends to be less intense with each period of recovery. On the other hand, reconditioning by pairing the same conditioned and unconditioned stimuli usually occurs much faster than the original conditioning.

A key conclusion is that extinction leaves a permanent trace; it does not simply reverse conditioning. This conclusion has been very important to both theories of classical conditioning and to its applications in behavioral therapy.

In human memory

Retroactive interference
Spontaneous recovery as it pertains to human memory can be traced back to the work of George Edward Briggs, who was concerned with the concept of retroactive interference. Inhibition, or interference, is a function of competition among responses, whereby a resultant memory has dominance over another.  It is not that the inhibited responses are lost from memory per se, but that they are kept by other responses from appearing.

Retroactive interference is the psychological theory of memory whereby learning something new impedes retrieval of a memory that was previously learned. Briggs studied retroactive interference using a test of free recall. In his study, participants learned paired associate words (i.e. A1-B1, A2-B2,...Ai-Bi) over multiple trials, until the learning of the Ai-Bi associates were perfected. Following this, participants were given a new list of paired associates, where the second word of the pair was changed while the first word of the associate pair was kept the same (A1-C1, A2-C2,... Ai-Ci). After mastery of this second list of paired associates, Briggs had participants perform a recall procedure. He presented a list A item and the participant was asked to recall whichever pair (the -Bi or –Ci) that came to mind. Based on retroactive interference, learning of A-B paired associates declined due to the learning of the subsequent A-C associates, and as a result, there was a higher rate of responses from list C by the participants on the recall test.

One day (24 hours) after learning both sets of associates, participants were again tested. Observed was a spontaneous recovery of Bi responses such that participants' responses of Bi items exceeded Ci items. It appeared that after a rest period, participants could spontaneously remember the initial paired associates that they were not able to remember following the subsequent presentation of a second paired associate list the day prior. This A-B, A-C paradigm was replicated by researcher Bruce R. Ekstrand, thus increasing confirmation regarding the existence of spontaneous recovery.

Role of sleep

In an experiment conducted to further the findings of Briggs and Ekstrand, it was discovered that sleep counteracts retroactive interference compared to wakefulness. Using the same A-B, A-C paradigm, results indicated that memory performance for the first list of word-pair associates (A-B) was superior when learning was followed by nocturnal sleep rather than when learning was followed by wakefulness. Sleep differentially affected the memory consolidation of the two lists, enhancing more significantly, the memory for the first list. It has been suggested that it is mainly the degree of initial learning that predicts whether spontaneous recovery shall occur, stating that the better the learning of the A-B associations, the more likely they are to recover after interference. This effect is further catalyzed by sleep, which appears to having an enhancing effect on memory consolidation.

Traumatic memories

Emotionally unpleasant experiences have the tendency to come back and haunt us, even after frequent suppression. Such memories can be recovered gradually, through active search and reconstruction, or they can come to mind spontaneously, without active search.

It is suggested that there are important differences between people who gradually recover memories of abuse during suggestive therapy sessions and those who recover memories of abuse more spontaneously. Research on the propensity to forget what they had just remembered was conducted on women who had spontaneously recovered, versus recovered through suggestive therapy, memories of childhood sexual abuse. Women who were of the group that spontaneously recovered their abuse were more likely (than women who recovered their memories of childhood abuse during suggestive therapy) to forget that they had successfully remembered words earlier on a memory test. As such, a reason that people might have a spontaneously recovered traumatic memory experience is because they simply forget having remembered the event before.  They might forget prior cases of remembering if the mental context present when they are having their recovery experience differs from the mental context on prior occasions when they thought about the event. It is thus such that people have not forgotten the event, but they simply cannot remember it, perhaps due to context-dependent memory.

Context-dependent extinction phenomena

Renewal effect
The phenomenon in which a change of context after extinction can cause a robust return of conditioned responding. There are three models whereby renewal effect is observed.

The most common model of observed renewal effect is the "ABA renewal". Conditioning is conducted in one context (context A) and extinction is then conducted in a second (context B). When the conditional stimulus (CS) is returned to the original conditioning context (context A), responding to the CS returns.
A second version, "ABC renewal" is where conditioning is conducted in context A, extinction conducted in context B, and then testing conducted in a third, "neutral" context (context C). Renewal of responding is observed in the neutral context.
The final version, "AAB renewal" works whereby conditioning and extinction are both conducted in the same context (context A) and then the CS is tested in a second context (context B). This model currently has the least evidence of returned conditioned responding.

Since spontaneous recovery is when an extinguished response occurs after time has passed following the extinction, it can be viewed as the renewal effect that results when the CS is tested outside of its temporal context.

Role of GABA in renewal effects

Gamma-aminobutyric acid (GABA) transmission plays a significant role in the processes of renewal and spontaneous recovery from extinction. In a study which tested the spontaneous recovery of appetitive responding of rats, normal control rats responded more to a CS when it was tested in its acquisition context (this is ABA renewal) than its extinction context (ABB renewal condition). This is a classic example of ABA renewal. Administration of the partial inverse agonist, FG 7142, to the GABAA receptor resulted in attenuated recovery in both the ABA and ABB test scenarios. The GABAA receptor inverse agonist reduced GABA transmission, and the result was attenuation of the impact of context in eliciting the renewal effect. This research suggests that GABAergic mechanisms (mechanisms pertaining to neurons that produce GABA as their output) mediate ABA renewal and spontaneous recovery in appetitive conditioning. As such, spontaneous recovery and renewal are believed to share a common psychological mechanism.

Rapid reacquisition
Reacquisition of a conditioned response (CR) post-extinction is often faster than the initial acquisition. This is an indication that the original learning was not destroyed but rather was "saved", through the process of extinction. Rapid reacquisition is normally produced when reinforced trials provide a contextual cue that can renew responding, by signaling the initial acquisition trials.

Data from studies conducted on conditioned suppression provide evidence that this effect might occur due to spontaneous recovery and reinstatement of contextual stimuli that did not get extinguished, and thus remains related to the US.

Rapid reacquisition may be partially an effect of ABA renewal, whereby an animal (undergoing conditional learning) learns that the initial conditioning trials with the CS-US pairings are part of an original context of conditioning, whereas the more recent presentations of the CS alone are part of the context of extinction. Thus, when CS-US pairings are resumed post-extinction, they put the animal back into the mindset of the original conditioning context, and this contextual cue aids in reacquiring the CR more quickly than the initial learning. As such, rapid reacquisition will be produced when reinforced initial learning trials create a contextual cue, that in future acquisition trials gets activated and brings about the renewal of responding, at a quicker rate than the initial response learning.

The process of extinction is such that trials are not reinforced, so that the CR of the animal declines when presented with the CS.  A situation in which extinction procedures contain both reinforced and non-reinforced trials would weaken reacquisition. This is because, introducing reinforced trials during extinction would result in the reinforced trials being associated both with extinction and conditional learning. This would render the animal less able to rapidly learn again the CR to the stimulus.

Reinstatement
Reinstatement refers to the recovery of conditioned behaviour produced by exposures to the US.  Reinstatement occurs when re-exposed to the US alone, after having undergone extinction. The effect is due to conditioning of the context, such that when the US is presented after extinction, an individual associates it with the original context.

Consider an example regarding reinstatement: say you learned an aversion to mangos because you got sick after eating one on a trip. Extinction of the aversion would result if you have frequent instances of eating bits of mangos without getting sick on many occasions. Reinstatement suggests that if you became sick again for some reason, the aversion to mangos would return even if your illness had nothing to do with eating mangos. In this example, after extinction, presentation of the US (the experience of being sick) brings about the conditioned behaviour to be aversive to mangos.

Hypermnesia
Hypermnesia is an improvement in memory that occurs with related attempts to retrieve previously encoded material. Hypermnesia is the net result of reminiscence and forgetting, such that the amount of reminiscence must exceed the amount of forgetting resulting in a net improvement overall. Ballard was the first to observe hypermnesia using a multiple recall task in 1913, the same task with which he discovered reminiscence. After asking young school children to memorize poetry, he initially retested their recall abilities 2 days later only to discover that the class improved by 10 percent over the initial recall level.

Hypermnesia was not considered a phenomenon until the mid-1970s, when Erdelyi and his associates completed further testing. Two suggestions have been offered to explain the increases in net recall over testing. One suggestion is that pictures and high imagery words enhance hypermnesia, speculating that this nature of stimuli is more recognizable and hence less susceptible to forgetting. The second suggestion is Roediger's level of recall hypothesis claiming that any variable that produces greater levels of depth processing lead to greater hypermnesia.

A 1991 study by Otani and Hodge suggests that hypermnesia does not occur with recognition but is found in cued recall experiments, showing that the improvement in memory performance is due to an increased rate of item recovery facilitated by relational processing. Relational processing can be made easier with well-categorized stimuli and helps to increase the availability or retrieval cues that in turn help to generate the to-be-remembered items. The phenomenon of hypermnesia is one that continues to be examined, particularly in terms of its generalization.

Therapies

Hypnotherapy
The term "hypnosis" is derived from the Greek word hypnos, which means "sleep". When in a state of hypnosis, otherwise known as a trance, one experiences deep relaxation and altered consciousness. This trance is particularly characterized by extreme suggestibility and heightened imagination. Within this state, individuals have complete free will and are indeed fully conscious, however they become hyperattentive to the subject at hand and nearly exclude any other thought.

This state of trance is widely used as a means to recall suppressed or repressed memories. During the sessions of hypnosis, a great deal of spontaneous recovery can occur because the conscious thoughts are slowed down to allow much higher retrieval. Some memories can seem foreign to the patient because they have never been recalled before; this is usual proof that the therapy is working.

False memories
Although hypnosis and other suggestive therapy is a great way to create spontaneous recovery of memories, false memories can be constructed in the process. False memories are memories that contain facts that are incorrect, yet they are strongly believed by the person obtaining the memory. Research states that a lot of suggestive therapy can cause a false memory in patients because of the intense suggestions given by the trusted therapist. Suggestions can stir up memories from movies, stories, magazines, and many other of the innumerable stimuli one sees throughout their life. Hypnosis is a more relaxed, aware state where subjects can bypass a lot of the conscious doubts and mind chatter and be aware of what comes up from the unconscious.

In the United States many mental health workers rely on hypnosis to retrieve memories. Previous research concludes that with the active conscious mind consistently taking up one's mental capacity, hypnosis provides the calmness to retrieve what's needed.

Psychoanalytic therapy
Psychoanalytic therapy is a form of therapy where the patient discusses their life issues with a therapist and the therapist can ask specific questions while using their expertise to find underlying issues. This method of therapy can cause spontaneous recovery that is cued from the therapists questioning. Psychoanalytic therapy has been known to treat many behavioural problems, unconscious feelings and thoughts that effect the present moment. Through recalling specific events and gaining a new perspective, a patient can alleviate the issue they are concerned with.

Group therapy
Group therapy is similar to psychoanalytic therapy but it involves other people with a similar issue. This therapy adds other perspectives to gain clarity on a situation, and can cause spontaneous recovery in more cases because of the increase in other points of view.

Cognitive behavioural therapy
Cognitive behavioural therapy is a therapy that works with irrational thinking towards a specific situation. The key here is that the person may have not had that specific behavioural problem their whole life, and allowing them to view the event with a new perspective can change their behaviour. This is done differently from psychoanalytic therapy by exposing the patient to the stimulus they are afraid of. Through this exposure, they can unlearn any patterns of thought they had towards it by realizing that they are safe, referred to as extinction. Although, studies have shown that certain stimuli can cue a spontaneous recovery if there was not a full extinction of the associated perception to a memory.

Cases
One case documented by researcher Geraerts portrays both spontaneous recovery and false memories in the case of Elizabeth Janssen (name has been changed for the patient's courtesy). She was a very depressed woman and she had no idea why. Her life was great and up to her standards but she felt an underlying depressed feeling. She went to suggestive therapy where the therapist decided to engage her in visual imagery techniques to attempt to bring up childhood abuse that the therapist suggested she had. She denied ever being abused and had no recollection at all of such events. The therapist gave her books to read and information to study on childhood abuse. As the weeks went on with therapy she began recalling images of her father sexually abusing her. Within this case one can speculate that the therapist could have implanted these memories with weeks of suggestion, self-study, and authoritative persuasion that took place.

Physiology

Procedural memory
For spontaneous recovery to occur, the conditioning of the memory that is recalled later needs to be stored in long-term memory. It is a process where the semantics and associations of the certain memory are so ingrained that they can become habitual, or automatic to the person. For example, all the procedures needed to ride a bicycle are not taken into play every time you ride it. One simply knows to step on the pedal, propel their body up onto the seat, grip the handles, begin to pedal, look ahead, check the gears, balance oneself, etc. All of this becomes a form of implicit memory that doesn't need any attention to control or effort in recall; they are there for use in any particular circumstance.

In regards to a more general application of procedural learning in our life is with our beliefs and values we can hold to a certain subject. For example, if many times you get extremely jealous of someone having something that you do not have because your family can't afford it when you were young, you could believe that "things in life are hard to come by". When you're an adult another situation could arise that is similar, and the recovery of that association and inner response can show up spontaneously as jealousy again. It is why a lot of people say to themselves, "where does this feeling come from" or, "Why did I do that?" A lot of human reactions are from spontaneous recovery of past associations, not always specifically learned physical behaviours.

Neurochemistry
For the learning and recall associated with spontaneous recovery to happen, there are specific gyri and neurotransmitters that play a role. Firstly, the cerebellum is needed to acquire certain motor skills and develop an automatic state with the movement patterns that are learned. Both the dorsal and ventral prefrontal cortex has been shown to play a big role in the development of memory consolidation and motor control. Reciprocal loops are formed through neural circuits between the basal ganglia and prefrontal cortex which consolidate the memory. To elicit a stronger consolidation, rewards can be involved; the case for Pavlovian conditioning. The reward-related learning causes dopamine to release from the synapses of the basal ganglia and creates a stronger bond between the stimulus and response. Furthermore, if there is a traumatic incident that is associated to a memory, and that becomes suppressed, the amygdala is responsible for this fear conditioning. The amygdala leads to the caudate nucleus in the neocortex of the basal ganglia, so the fear response can also be triggered via spontaneous recovery. Basically, the stronger the emotional arousal after a learning event, positive or negative, can greatly enhance the memory's recall in the future.

Another area of the brain important for memory recovery is the hippocampus and medial temporal lobes. Regarding the former, studies have shown that the hippocampus is a crucial area to strengthen memories by forming stronger connections between neurons. This is done when a person associates more stimuli with a particular memory and it becomes more easily accessible. Temporal lobes are said to be the area of the brain that are important for storing new memories when learning. The availability of memories accessible to recall is positively correlated with the size and function of a person's temporal lobe.

Drugs and psychostimulants
All drugs and stimulants of the brain can affect how someone learns, consolidates, and retrieves certain memories. For example, cocaine blocks the reuptake of dopamine, a neurotransmitter in the brain, causing an increase of dopamine in the synaptic cleft. This will elicit a rewarding feeling of liberation and security that can become addictive to some people. Although, because of the increased dopamine levels in the brain, consolidation of memory can be affected which will then inhibit the chances of recovering that memory. Studies show that rats who were given cocaine were unable to perform motor tasks as successfully as the control group. Also, cannabis has also shown negative effects regarding the ability to spontaneously recover memories because the plasticity strength of the initial memories are so inhibited due to the reduced neurotransmitters in the synaptic cleft.

Another relation of drugs to spontaneous recovery is the incidences regarding relapse. A recovered addict can be presented with stimuli that spontaneously recover motivational feelings that are believed to cause the relapse. The longer the extinction period of the abstinence from the drug, the more vulnerable to person is to relapsing spontaneously. For example, cocaine addicts who are thought to be "cured" can experience an irresistible impulse to use the drug again if they are subsequently confronted by a stimulus with strong connections to the drug, such as a white powder.

Disorders
Spontaneous recovery, in terms of disorders, is a phenomenon in which the unwanted condition is overcome without professional treatment or formal help.

Autism
Observed through case study, was a particular individual who spontaneously "recovered" from autistic disorder after a mere 13 days, without therapeutic intervention. This individual was diagnosed with autistic disorder and severe mental retardation as per the DSM-IV-TR criteria. Over the course of 13 days, this individual revealed age appropriate reciprocal social interaction and communication by means of gesture, when no signs of communication were visible prior to the onset of the recovery period. This individual could also now show affection, emotional warmth, and self-expression.

No other instances of such rapid spontaneous "recovery" from autism have been yet documented, and currently, this "recovery" is quite unexplained and a matter of controversy.

Aphasia
Spontaneous recovery of language ability has been documented in patients who became aphasic following a stroke. For the purposes of assessing spontaneous recovery, the patients received no speech therapy and were assessed weekly following the stroke. Improvement in language ability occurred, despite the lack of professional treatment. Improvement occurred most markedly between the 4 and 10 weeks after the stroke, with little change following this time period. Most studies of spontaneous language recovery following stroke have exhibited that the improvement occurs within the first 3 to 4 months. This finding is of particular interest to speech therapists, to be able to separate natural recovery from aphasia in stroke patients, from improvement that is intervention-based.

Further reading
 Pavlov, Ivan P. (1927), Conditioned Reflexes, Oxford: Oxford University Press. .

References

Learning